Kenny Morris (born Kenneth Ian Morris; 1 February 1957) is an English drummer, songwriter and visual artist. He was the first studio drummer of Siouxsie and the Banshees. He joined the band in January 1977; he had attended their first live appearance at the 100 Club a few months earlier and had been impressed by their performance. Morris's first studio recording with the group was in November 1977 when they recorded their first John Peel session for BBC radio. Music journalist Kris Needs said : "Like as a rhythm machine for feet and guts Kenny Morris' drumming is unorthodox, primitive (in a tribal sense) and far removed from the clicking hi-hats of the fly-strength paradiddle merchants".

He played mostly toms. He has been cited as a major influence by several drummers of the post-punk era including Stephen Morris of Joy Division, Kevin Haskins of Bauhaus, and  Paul Ferguson of Killing Joke.

During the recording of the band's debut single "Hong Kong Garden", producer Steve Lillywhite suggested to him to record the drums separately. Morris did the bass drum and the snare drum first. He did the cymbals and the tom-toms later. Lillywhite also added echo on the drums, adding significant space to the entire recording. NME wrote that Lillywhite's work with Morris "revolutionis[ed] the post-punk band's sound with an innovative approach to laying down the drums".

Morris played on the albums The Scream (1978) and Join Hands (1979). He left the band a few hours before a concert in Aberdeen at the beginning of the Join Hands tour, on 7 September 1979.

Life and career
Kenny Morris was born of Irish parents. 
He grew up in Waltham Abbey, Essex. He attended St Ignatius' College in Enfield, where he became a friend of future collaborator and film director John Maybury. Morris then attended Barnet College in London. He also studied fine art and film-making at North East London Polytechnic. He first talked with Siouxsie and the Banshees in September 1976 after seeing their first concert at the 100 Club in London. He was attending Camberwell School of Arts and Crafts when he briefly joined the band the Flowers of Romance but after six months of rehearsals, they split before giving any concert. They didn't record anything.

He joined Siouxsie and the Banshees in January 1977. He played cymbals-less drumming on most of their songs.  

After leaving the Banshees, Morris worked as a drummer with Helen Terry and other musicians for live stage sets. He recorded and produced a 12" inch vinyl featuring two spoken words, performed by Dorothée Lalanne; "La Main Morte"  and "Le Testament d'Auguste Rodin". "La Main Morte" was a film soundtrack co-composed with Maybury and Jean-Pierre Baudry (from French band Marc Seberg). "La Main Morte" was released on  Genesis P-Orridge's Temple Records.

Morris also directed five short films including La Main Morte, Blind Obedience, Le Trois Grace, Marilyn and Summer House. The films were all uploaded on his YouTube channel.

In 1993, after living in London for twenty years, Morris moved to Ireland and, with a BA Honours degree in Fine Art, held several teaching posts. He ran an art gallery in Kildare Town in the late 1990s.

He paints and draws and sells his work online via his facebook official site. He now resides in Cork, Ireland where he continues practicing and teaching Art.

In January 2021, he revealed in an interview that he had written his autobiography.

References

English drummers
British post-punk musicians
Living people
1957 births
Alumni of Camberwell College of Arts
Siouxsie and the Banshees members